The Hamilton Tiger-Cats defeated the Winnipeg Blue Bombers in the annual Grey Cup in 1953.

Canadian Football News in 1953
The Canadian Rugby Union was paid in total of $20,500 by three television stations for the rights to show the Grey Cup game live. Edmonton's Billy Vessels (RB), became the first player to win the Schenley Award as the Most Outstanding Player Award. G. Sydney Halter, QC was named as WIFU Commissioner.

For the 1953 season, it was ruled that the ORFU winners would travel west to play the WIFU winners in a semi-final game. This arrangement continued in the 1954 season.

Regular season

Final regular season standings
Source:

Note: GP = Games Played, W = Wins, L = Losses, T = Ties, PF = Points For, PA = Points Against, Pts = Points

Bold text means that they have clinched the playoffs.
Edmonton has a bye and will play in the WIFU Finals.
Kitchener-Waterloo has a bye and will play in the ORFU Finals.

Grey Cup playoffs
Note: All dates in 1953

Semifinals

Winnipeg won the total-point series by 60–23. The Blue Bombers will play the Edmonton Eskimos in the WIFU Finals.

Toronto Balmy Beach won the total-point series by 18–12. The Beachers will play the Kitchener-Waterloo Dutchmen in the ORFU Finals.

Finals

Winnipeg wins the best of three series 2–1. The Blue Bombers will play the Toronto Balmy Beach Beachers in the Grey Cup semifinal.

Toronto won the total-point series by 30–21. The Beachers will play the Winnipeg Blue Bombers in the Grey Cup semifinal.

Hamilton wins the best of three series 2–0. The Tiger-Cats will advance to the Grey Cup game.

Grey Cup semifinal

The Winnipeg Blue Bombers will advance to the Grey Cup game.

Playoff bracket

Grey Cup Championship

1953 Eastern (Interprovincial Rugby Football Union) All-Stars
Offence
QB – Sam Etcheverry, Montreal Alouettes
RB – Avatus Stone, Ottawa Rough Riders
RB – Joe Scudero, Toronto Argonauts
RB – Gene Roberts, Ottawa Rough Riders
E  – Red O'Quinn, Montreal Alouettes
E  – Bernie Flowers, Ottawa Rough Riders
FW – Bob Simpson, Ottawa Rough Riders
C  – Tommy Hugo, Montreal Alouettes
OG – Kaye Vaughan, Ottawa Rough Riders
OG – Ed Bradley, Montreal Alouettes
OT – Tex Coulter, Montreal Alouettes
OT – Vince Mazza, Hamilton Tiger-CatsDefence
DT – Tex Coulter, Montreal Alouettes
DT – Vince Mazza, Hamilton Tiger-Cats
DE – Pete Neumann, Hamilton Tiger-Cats
DE – Doug McNichol, Montreal Alouettes
DG – Vince Scott, Hamilton Tiger-Cats
DG – Eddie Bevan, Hamilton Tiger-Cats
LB – Red Ettinger, Toronto Argonauts
LB – Ralph Toohy, Hamilton Tiger-Cats
LB – Tommy Hugo, Montreal Alouettes
DB – Dick Brown, Hamilton Tiger-Cats
DB – Howie Turner, Ottawa Rough Riders
DB – Lou Kusserow, Hamilton Tiger-Cats
S  - Teddy Toogood, Toronto Argonauts

1953 Western (Western Interprovincial Football Union) All-Stars
Offence
QB – Claude Arnold, Edmonton Eskimos
RB – Rollie Miles, Edmonton Eskimos
RB – Billy Vessels, Edmonton Eskimos
RB – Normie Kwong, Edmonton Eskimos
E  – Mac Speedie, Saskatchewan Roughriders
E  – Bud Grant, Winnipeg Blue Bombers
FW – Bud Korchak, Winnipeg Blue Bombers
C  – Eagle Keys, Edmonton Eskimos
OG – Mike Cassidy, Saskatchewan Roughriders
OG – Jim Quondamatteo, Edmonton Eskimos
OT – Leon Manley, Edmonton Eskimos
OT – Martin Ruby, Saskatchewan RoughridersDefence
DT – Dick Huffman, Winnipeg Blue Bombers
DT – Martin Ruby, Saskatchewan Roughriders
DE – Frank Anderson, Edmonton Eskimos
DE – Ezzret Anderson, Calgary Stampeders
DG – Dean Bandiera, Winnipeg Blue Bombers
DG – Gordon Brown, Calgary Stampeders
LB – John Wozniak, Saskatchewan Roughriders
LB – Tony Momsen, Calgary Stampeders
DB – Ray Willsey, Edmonton Eskimos
DB – Bobby Marlow, Saskatchewan Roughriders
DB – Neill Armstrong, Winnipeg Blue Bombers
S  – Tom Casey, Winnipeg Blue Bombers

1953 Ontario Rugby Football Union All-Stars
NOTE: During this time most players played both ways, so the All-Star selections do not distinguish between some offensive and defensive positions.
QB – Bob Schneidenbach, Toronto Balmy Beach Beachers
HB – Dick Gregory - Toronto Balmy Beach Beachers
HB – Jack Mancos, Kitchener-Waterloo Dutchmen 	
HB – John Duchene, Sarnia Imperials
E  – Harvey Singleton, Toronto Balmy Beach Beachers
E  – Keith Fisher, Sarnia Imperials
FW – Johnny Chorostecki, Sarnia Imperials
C  – Bruce Mattingly, Sarnia Imperials
G  – Jay Fry, Kitchener-Waterloo Dutchmen
G  – Lloyd "Dutch" Davey, Sarnia Imperials
T  – Oatten Fisher, Toronto Balmy Beach Beachers
T  – Maurice Dorocke, Sarnia Imperials

1953 Canadian Football Awards
 Most Outstanding Player Award – Billy Vessels (RB), Edmonton Eskimos
 Jeff Russel Memorial Trophy (IRFU MVP) – Bob Cunningham (FB), Ottawa Rough Riders
 Jeff Nicklin Memorial Trophy (WIFU MVP) - John Henry Johnson (RB), Calgary Stampeders
 Gruen Trophy (IRFU Rookie of the Year) - Bob Dawson (RB), Hamilton Tiger-Cats
 Dr. Beattie Martin Trophy (WIFU Rookie of the Year) - Gordon Sturtridge (DE), Saskatchewan Roughriders
 Imperial Oil Trophy (ORFU MVP) - Dick Gregory - Toronto Balmy Beach Beachers

References

 
Canadian Football League seasons